Marat Rostislavovich Magkeyev (born 24 September 1983) is a former Russian professional football player.

Club career
He played in the Russian Football National League for FC Dynamo Bryansk in 2010.

References

External links
 

1983 births
Living people
Russian footballers
Association football defenders
FC Chernomorets Novorossiysk players
FC Dynamo Stavropol players
FC Jūrmala players
FC Orenburg players
FC Dynamo Bryansk players
FC Spartak-UGP Anapa players
Latvian Higher League players
Russian expatriate footballers
Expatriate footballers in Latvia
Russian expatriate sportspeople in Latvia